Sideroxylon retinerve is a species of plant in the family Sapotaceae. It is endemic to Honduras.

References

retinerve
Endemic flora of Honduras
Critically endangered flora of North America
Taxonomy articles created by Polbot